Gabriel Sleath (1674 - c24 March 1756), the son of a tallow chandler, was a London gold- and silversmith and an outspoken critic of Huguenot goldsmiths' working in England.

Sleath was born and died in Barnet, London.  In 1753 he entered into a partnership with Francis Crump, his former apprentice.

He was buried from St Vedast Foster Lane.

References

External links

English silversmiths
1674 births
1756 deaths
People from Chipping Barnet
English goldsmiths
17th-century English people
18th-century English people